Strawberry ice cream is a flavor of ice cream made with strawberry or strawberry flavoring. It is made by blending in fresh strawberries or strawberry flavoring with the eggs, cream, vanilla and sugar used to make ice cream.  Most strawberry ice cream is colored pink or light red.  Strawberry ice cream dates back at least to 1813, when it was served at the second inauguration of James Madison. Along with vanilla and chocolate ice cream, strawberry is one of the three flavors in Neapolitan ice cream.  Variations of strawberry ice cream include strawberry cheesecake ice cream and strawberry ripple ice cream, which is vanilla ice cream with a ribbon of strawberry jam or syrup. Some ice cream sandwiches are prepared neapolitan-style, and include strawberry ice cream.

History

- January 15 is National Strawberry Ice Cream Day  ---possibly celebrating its debut at the above-mentioned Inauguration.

The earliest account for strawberry ice cream occurred in 1744, when Thomas Bladen, the governor of Maryland served a dessert of frozen strawberries and ice cream to commissioners.

The strawberry ice cream is steeped in legend, when in the early 19th, berries were used to flavor and color a unique desert created by Sallie Shadd, a freed slave who her family ran a tearoom in Wilmington, Delaware.

In 1812, Dolley Madison served a magnificent creation of strawberry ice cream during President James Madison's inaugural banquet at the White House in Washington D.C.

 Way back in 1813, James Madison's wife and first lady, Dolly Madison created it for the second inaugural banquet at the White House. It has since been voted as the 8th most popular ice cream in America. It is one of the ice cream flavors in Neapolitan ice cream. Strawberry ice cream has changed the course of history to the extent that it has a worldwide holiday on January 15. It has adopted a Pinkish color. This is also Mr. Jackson's favorite ice cream.

See also

 Chocolate ice cream
 Neapolitan ice cream
 Vanilla ice cream
 List of strawberry dishes

References

Bibliography

Flavors of ice cream
Strawberry dishes